Nasr Eddin Abbas (born 13 August 1944), known by his nickname Jaksa, is a Sudanese former footballer who played with Al-Hilal Club. He participated in the Africa Cup of Nations 1963 and 1970 and in 1972 Summer Olympics in Munich.

International goals

Scores and results list Sudan's goal tally first, score column indicates score after each Sudan goal.

Honours
Al-Hilal
 Sudan Premier League: 1965, 1966, 1969, 1973

Sudan
 Africa Cup of Nations: 1970 ; runner-up: 1963
 Pan Arab Games Silver medal: 1965

Individual
 Best Sudanese player of the 20th century

References

External links
 
 Player profile - Home of football statistics & history
 Nasr Eddin Abbas Jexa - El Sahya

1944 births
Living people
People from Omdurman
Sudanese footballers
Sudan international footballers
1963 African Cup of Nations players
1970 African Cup of Nations players
Association football midfielders
Olympic footballers of Sudan
Footballers at the 1972 Summer Olympics
Al-Hilal Club (Omdurman) players
Africa Cup of Nations-winning players
Al-Hilal Club (Omdurman) managers